IBFI may stand for:

 Independent Baptist Fellowship International
 Internationales Begegnungs- und Forschungszentrum für Informatik